The 2014 Syracuse Orange football team represented Syracuse University in the 2014 NCAA Division I FBS football season. The Orange were led by second year head coach Scott Shafer and played their home games at the Carrier Dome. They were members of the Atlantic Division of the Atlantic Coast Conference. They finished the season 3–9, 1–7 in ACC play to finish in a tie for sixth place in the Atlantic Division.

Previous season

The Orange's 2013 season was their first members of the Atlantic Coast Conference. They finished the year with a 7–6 record, and finished tied for 3rd place in the Atlantic Division, with a 4–4 record in ACC play. The Orange capped off their season with a win in the 2013 Texas Bowl over Minnesota.

Personnel

Coaching staff

Source:

Schedule

Source:

Game summaries

Villanova

Central Michigan

Maryland

Notre Dame

Louisville

Florida State

Wake Forest

Clemson

NC State

Duke

Pittsburgh

Boston College

References

Syracuse
Syracuse Orange football seasons
Syracuse Orange football